is a passenger railway station located in the Sue neighborhood of Tama-ku, Kawasaki, Kanagawa, Japan and operated by the private railway operator Keio Corporation. With Hashimoto Station and Wakabadai Station, it is one of only three Keio Line stations located in Kanagawa Prefecture.

Lines

Station layout
The station has two elevated side platforms serving two tracks.

Platforms

History
Keio-Inadazutsumi Station opened on April 1, 1971. Express services began in 2001.

Passenger statistics
In fiscal 2019, the station was used by an average of 57,300 passengers daily.

The passenger figures for previous years are as shown below.

Surrounding area
 Inadazutsumi Station on the JR Nambu Line

See also
 List of railway stations in Japan

References

External links 

  

Keio Sagamihara Line
Stations of Keio Corporation
Railway stations in Japan opened in 1971
Railway stations in Kawasaki, Kanagawa